Austrophya monteithorum is a species of dragonfly in the family Austrocorduliidae, 
known as the summit mystic. 
It is probably a small dragonfly, adults have not been seen. It is known only from larva found at the summit plateau of Thornton Peak, north-west of Cairns in tropical Queensland, Australia.

Etymology
Austrophya monteithorum is named after Geoff and Sybil Monteith of the Queensland Museum who collected the type material in an expedition to Thornton Peak in 1984.

See also
 List of Odonata species of Australia

References

Austrocorduliidae
Corduliidae
Synthemistidae
Odonata of Australia
Endemic fauna of Australia
Taxa named by Günther Theischinger
Insects described in 2019
Fauna of Queensland